Phyllonorycter leucaspis is a moth of the family Gracillariidae. It is known from Namibia. The habitat consists of richly vegetated valleys between 1,600 and 1,900 meters elevation dominated by Acacia hereroensis, Dombeya rotundifolia and Rhus species.

The length of the forewings is 3.53 mm. The forewings are golden ochreous with white markings. The hindwings are light fuscous with a pale greyish golden fringe. Adults are on wing in March.

References

Endemic fauna of Namibia
Moths described in 2004
leucaspis
Insects of Namibia
Moths of Africa